Kevin Yoshimi Asano (born April 20, 1963) is a retired judoka from the United States, who won the silver medal in the men's extra-lightweight competition at the 1988 Summer Olympics. On his way to capturing the medal he beat Shinji Hosokawa, who was the reigning world champion and 1984 Gold Medalist. Asano came close to winning the gold medal, but lost it on a one-point penalty to Kim Jae-Yup of South Korea.

Personal life

Asano was born in Hawaii. He graduated from Pearl City High School in Hawaii in 1981, studied Japanese and trained in judo at Tokai University for two years, then went on to study at San José State University where he graduated in 1989 in accounting. In 2008, Kevin Asano's autobiography, Step Onto the Mat: Journey to True Success, was published by White Mountain Castle Publishing. He co-founded Pacific Rim Legacy Group, a financial planning organization and Personal Transformation International, a 501(c)3 organization. He has served as President of Hawaii Judo, Inc., the state judo governing body of USA Judo and President of the United States Judo Federation, a grassroots national judo organization. He is also the head instructor of Leeward Judo Club in Hawaii.

Awards and honors
USA Judo announced Kevin Asano among its inaugural Hall of Fame inductees in 2008 along with Edward Liddie, Mike Swain and Jimmy Pedro. He is also a member of the Hawaii Sports Hall of Fame 2000 inductees is also a member of the San Jose State University Sports Hall of Fame. In 1988, Asano was named the US Olympic Committee's US Judo Athlete of the Year.

Books authored
Asano has authored the following book:
 Step Onto the Mat (White Mountain Castle Publishing, LLC, 2008)

References

 Profile

External links
 Hawaii Sports Hall of Fame Profile
 Kevin Asano's Website
 Pacific Rim Legacy Group LLC
 Leeward Judo Club
 Personal Transformation International

1963 births
Living people
Tokai University alumni
American male judoka
Judoka at the 1988 Summer Olympics
Olympic judoka of the United States
Olympic silver medalists for the United States in judo
San Jose State University alumni
American autobiographers
American motivational speakers
American sportspeople of Japanese descent
Medalists at the 1988 Summer Olympics
Pan American Games silver medalists for the United States
Pan American Games medalists in judo
Judoka at the 1987 Pan American Games
Medalists at the 1987 Pan American Games